George Herbert Marsden (born 16 October 1880 – 7 July 1948) was an English dual-code international rugby union and professional rugby league footballer who played in the 1890s and 1900s. He played representative rugby union (RU) for England and Yorkshire, and at club level for Morley R.F.C., as a fly-half, i.e. number 10, and representative level rugby league (RL) for England and Yorkshire, and at club level for Bradford F.C. (now Bradford Park Avenue A.F.C.)

Background
George Marsden was born in Morley, West Riding of Yorkshire, England. He died on 7 July 1948 in Lytham St Annes, Lancashire, England.

Playing career

International honours
George Marsden won caps for England (RU) while at Morley R.F.C. in the 1900 Home Nations Championship against Wales, Ireland, and Scotland, and won a cap for England (RL) while at Bradford F.C. in 1905 against Other Nationalities.

County honours
George Marsden won 11-caps for Yorkshire (RU) while at Morley R.F.C. up to and including 1900, and won cap(s) for Yorkshire (RL) while at Bradford between 1900 and 1906.

When Bradford converted from the rugby union code to the rugby league code on 29 August 1895, George Marsden would have been 14 years of age. Consequently, he was too young to have been a rugby union footballer for Bradford FC, and he won his England (RU) caps during 1900 at Morley R.F.C., changing club and code to Bradford and rugby league in 1900.

Championship final appearances
George Marsden played  and was captain in Bradford FC's 5-0 victory over Salford in the Championship tiebreaker during the 1903–04 season at Thrum Hall, Hanson Lane, Halifax on Thursday 28 April 1904, in front of a crowd of 12,000.

Challenge Cup Final appearances
George Marsden played  and was captain in Bradford's 5-0 victory over Salford in the 1906 Challenge Cup Final during the 1905–06 season at Headingley Rugby Stadium, Leeds, on Saturday 28 April 1906, in front of a crowd of 15,834.

Rugby union administration
Despite his previous involvement in rugby league, and the animosity between rugby union and rugby league, George Marsden was one of the founding members of the rugby union club Fylde Rugby Club in 1919.

References

External links
[http://www.rlhp.co.uk/imagedetail.asp?id=1432 Image 
[http://www.rlhp.co.uk/imagedetail.asp?id=1433 Image 

1880 births
1948 deaths
Bradford F.C. captains
Bradford F.C. players
Dual-code rugby internationals
England international rugby union players
England national rugby league team players
English rugby league players
English rugby union players
Morley R.F.C. players
Rugby league five-eighths
Rugby league players from Leeds
Rugby union fly-halves
Rugby union players from Leeds
Sportspeople from Morley, West Yorkshire
Yorkshire County RFU players
Yorkshire rugby league team players